The following are the dioceses or bishoprics of the Philippine Independent Church, an Independent Catholic and Anglo-Catholic denomination, along with their respective bishops and cathedrals (seats of the dioceses), organized by the church's bishops conference (as of 2023):

Dioceses under the Obispo Máximo

Diocese of Nueva Vizcaya and Quirino
 Cathedral of St. Louis Beltran
 Solano, Nueva Vizcaya
Diocese of Iloilo
 Cathedral of Our Lady of Peace and Good Voyage
 La Paz, Iloilo City
Diocese of Northern Isabela
 Cathedral of St. Joseph the Worker
 Delfin Albano, Isabela
Diocese of La Union, Ilocos Sur, and Abra (LUISA)
 Cathedral of St. Stephen
 San Esteban, Ilocos Sur
Diocese of Santiago (DioSa)
 Cathedral of St. James the Greater
 Santiago, Isabela
Diocese of Marinduque, Quezon, Batangas and Camarines (MaQueBaCa)
 Pro-Cathedral of St. Joseph the Worker
 Gasan, Marinduque
Diocese of Palawan
 Pro-Cathedral of Sts. Peter and Paul
 Puerto Princesa City, Palawan
Iglesia Filipina Independiente National Cathedral
 Cathedral of the Holy Child
 Ermita, Manila

Dioceses under Diocesan Bishops

North Central Luzon Bishops Conference (NCLBC)

Chairperson: The Rt. Revd. Dindo D. Rañojo

Diocese of Batac
 The Rt. Revd. Emelyn G. Dacuycuy
 Cathedral of Saint Mary, Aglipay National Shrine
 Batac, Ilocos Norte
Diocese of Laoag
 The Rt. Revd. Vermilion C. Tagalog
 Cathedral of St. William the Hermit
 Laoag City, Ilocos Norte
Diocese of Tuguegarao
 The Rt. Revd. Conrado M. de Guzman 
 Pro-Cathedral of St. William
 Ballesteros, Cagayan
Diocese of Rosales
 The Rt. Revd. Emmanuel F. Sampayan Jr.
 Cathedral of St. Anthony of Padua
 Rosales, Pangasinan
Diocese of Dagupan
 The Rt. Revd. Jovy Fodulla
 Pro-Cathedral of St. Joseph, SBVM
 Lingayen, Pangasinan
Diocese of Nueva Ecija
 The Rt. Revd. Jojit S. Sayas 
 Cathedral of St. Jerome
 Baloc, Sto. Domingo, Nueva Ecija
Diocese of Tarlac
 The Rt. Revd. Dindo D. Rañojo
 Cathedral of Immaculate Conception
 Victoria, Tarlac
Diocese of Zambales
 The Rt. Revd. Santiago R. Azaula (Assisting Bishop to the Obispo Máximo)
 Cathedral Church of San Roque (St. Roche)
 San Felipe, Zambales

South Central Luzon Bishops Conference (SCLBC)

Chairperson: The Rt. Revd. Joselito T. Cruz

Diocese of Bataan and Bulacan (BatBul)
 The Rt. Revd. Joselito T. Cruz
 Cathedral of Immaculate Conception
 F. Estrella St., Sto. Rosario, Malolos City, Bulacan
Diocese of Cavite
 The Rt. Revd. Emiliano D. Domingo
 Cathedral of St. Michael and All Archangels
 H. Rubio St., Digman, Bacoor, Cavite
Diocese of Greater Manila Area (GMA)
 The Rt. Revd. Vicente Salvador R. Ballesteros 
 Cathedral of the Crucified Lord 
 Sampaguita St., Kangkong, Quezon City
Diocese of Masbate
 The Rt. Revd. Rowel S. Arevalo (Assisting Bishop to the Obispo Máximo)
 Cathedral of Our Lady of Remedies
 Placer, Masbate
Diocese of Rizal and Pampanga (RizPam)
 The Most Revd. Godofredo J. David, Obispo Máximo XI, D.D.
 Cathedral of the Holy Child (Sto. Niño)
 241 Aglipay St., Poblacion, Mandaluyong
Diocese of Laguna
 The Rt. Revd. Rowel S. Arevalo
 Cathedral of Our Lady of Maulawin
 A. Mabini St., Sta. Cruz, Laguna
Diocese of Romblon and Mindoros (ROOM)
 The Rt. Revd. Ronelio V. Fabriquier
 Cathedral of St. Vincent Ferrer
 J.P Rizal St., Poblacion, Odiongan, Romblon

Visayas Bishops Conference (ViBisCon)

Chairperson: The Rt. Revd. Alger D. Loyao Sr.

Diocese of Antique
 The Rt. Revd. Leon T. Estrella
 Cathedral of St. Jude Thaddeus
 Veñegas St., Sibalom, Antique
Diocese of Aklan and Capiz
 The Rt. Revd. Leon T. Estrella (Assisting Bishop to the Obispo Máximo)
 Cathedral of Our Lady of Providence and Guidance
 Albasan, Numancia, Aklan
Diocese of Biliran and Leyte
 The Rt. Revd. Victor M. Palero
 Cathedral of Our Lady of Peace and Good Voyage
 Almeria, Biliran
Diocese of Samar
 The Rt. Revd. Mervin Jose G. Elimanco
 Cathedral of the Holy Trinity
 Trinidad, Calbayog, Samar
Diocese of Padre Burgos
 The Rt. Revd. Arly M. Balili
 Cathedral of St. James the Apostle
 Sta. Sofia St., Padre Burgos, Southern Leyte
Diocese of Cebu
 The Rt. Revd. Alger D. Loyao Sr.
 Cathedral of the Holy Child (Sto. Niño)
 Mabini St., Cebu City
Diocese of Bohol
 The Rt. Revd. Romeo G. Tagud (Assisting Bishop to the Obispo Máximo)
 Cathedral Church of St. Joseph the Worker
 Tamblot St., Cogon, Tagbilaran, Bohol

Diocese of Guimaras
 The Rt. Revd. Christopher N. Macaday
 Cathedral of Our Lady of Salvation
 Salvacion, Buenavista, Guimaras
Diocese of Negros Occidental
 The Rt. Revd. Virgilio B. Amihan Jr.
 Cathedral of St. John the Baptist
 Bago, Negros Occidental
Diocese of Negros Oriental and Siquijor (DiNOS)
 The Rt. Revd. Allan C. Caparro
 Cathedral of St. Andrew the Apostle
 Aldecoa Ave., Daro, Dumaguete, Negros Oriental

Mindanao Bishops Conference (MinBisCon)

Chairperson: The Rt. Revd. Romeo G. Tagud

Diocese of Cortes
 The Rt. Revd. Denny D. Dapitan
 Cathedral of St. Joseph, SBVM
 Cortes, Surigao del Sur
Diocese of Dinagat
 The Rt. Revd. Julius C. Dacera (Assisting Bishop to the Obispo Máximo)
 Cathedral of the Blessed Virgin Mary
 Dinagat, Dinagat Islands
Diocese of Cabadbaran
 The Rt. Revd. Delfin D. Callao Jr.
 Cathedral of Our Lady of Presentation
 Cabadbaran, Agusan del Norte
Diocese of Libertad
 The Rt. Revd. Redeemer A. Yañez Jr.
 Cathedral of St. Matthew
 Poblacion, Libertad, Misamis Oriental
Diocese of Cagayan de Oro
 The Rt. Revd. Felixberto L. Calang
 Metropolitan Cathedral of Jesus the Nazarene
 Pabayo-Pacana Sts., Cagayan de Oro
Diocese of Oroquieta
 The Rt. Revd. Victom Y. Batoy
 Cathedral of St. Mary
 Poblacion 1, Oroquieta City, Misamis Occidental

Diocese of Ozamiz
 The Rt. Revd. Carlo A. Morales
 Cathedral Church of St. Mary
 Mabini St. cor. J.L. Luna St., Aguada, Ozamiz City, Misamis Occidental
Diocese of Pagadian
 The Rt. Revd. Carlo A. Morales (Assisting Bishop to the Obispo Máximo)
 Cathedral of St. Luke, the Apostle and Physician
 Pagadian City, Zamboanga del Sur
Diocese of Siargao
 The Rt. Revd. Romeo G. Tagud
 Cathedral of the Holy Child
 Dapa, Surigao del Norte
Diocese of Davao
 The Rt. Revd. Romeo G. Tagud (Assisting Bishop to the Obispo Máximo)
 Cathedral of the Risen Lord
 F. Torres-Tuvera Sts., Davao City
Diocese of Surigao
 The Most Revd. Rhee M. Timbang, Obispo Máximo XIII
 Cathedral of the Transfiguration
 Km. 2, National Road, Surigao City, Surigao del Norte
Diocese of Tubod
 The Rt. Revd. Raul O. Amorcillo
 Cathedral of St. James, the Lord's Brother and the Just
 Rufo dela Cruz St., Tubod, Lanao del Norte
Diocese of Malaybalay
 The Rt. Revd. Gil M. Dinapo
 Cathedral of the Transfiguration
 Malaybalay City, Bukidnon
Diocese of Koronadal
 The Rt. Revd. Giomary P. Neri
 Cathedral of the Holy Trinity
 Koronadal City, South Cotabato

Dioceses abroad

North America

Diocese of Tampa
 The Rt. Revd. Valentin Lorejo (Assisting Bishop to the Obispo Máximo)
 Cathedral of Jesus of Nazareth
 14322 North Blvd., Tampa, Florida, United States of America
Diocese of Western USA and Western Canada (WUSACA) and the Pacific Islands
 The Rt. Revd. Gerry F. Engnan (Assisting Bishop to the Obispo Máximo)
 Cathedral Parish of the Holy Child
 6301 W. Olympic Blvd., Los Angeles, California, United States of America

Congregations/fellowships abroad
Great Britain and Ireland (with the Anglican Diocese of London Filipino Chaplaincy)
 The Rev'd. Canon Larry Galon
 St. John's Church Notting Hill
 Lansdowne Crescent, London W11 2NN, England, United Kingdom
Hong Kong
 Rev. Fr. Dwight Q. dela Torre
 St. John's Cathedral
 4 Garden Rd., Central, Hong Kong
United Arab Emirates (community)
 Rev. Fr. Glenn D. Edralin
 Abu Dhabi, United Arab Emirates
Singapore (community)
 Rev. Fr. Dwight Q. dela Torre
 St. Andrew's Cathedral
 11 St. Andrew's Road, Central Area, Singapore

See also
 Philippine Independent Church
 List of cathedrals in the Philippines
 List of Roman Catholic dioceses in the Philippines
 Christianity in the Philippines
 Episcopal Church in the Philippines

External links

The Official Website of the Iglesia Filipina Independiente – Diocese of Greater Manila

Philippine Independent Church
Dioceses in the Philippines
Philippine Independent Church
Dioceses of the Philippine Independent Church